Nikolett Brigovácz (born 5 August 1977)  is a former Hungarian handball player, her position was right back. She is a European champion. During her career she played beside of Hungary, in Austria, in Denmark, in Spain and in Portugal.

Achievements 
 Nemzeti Bajnokság I:
 Winner: 1997, 1999, 2000
 Magyar Kupa:
 Winner: 1995, 1997
 European Championship:
 Winner: 2000

References

External links 
Profile on EHF

1977 births
Living people
Hungarian female handball players
Expatriate handball players
Hungarian expatriate sportspeople in Austria
Hungarian expatriates in Denmark
Hungarian expatriate sportspeople in Spain
Fehérvár KC players

Hungarian expatriate sportspeople in Portugal